This is a list of airline holding companies, that either own more than one airline or are the parent company of a single airline.

A company or firm in which the holding company owns a significant portion of voting shares, usually 20–50% or a "minority of share ownership", is known as an associate company. A company in which the holding company owns more than 50% voting shares or a "majority of share ownership" is known as a subsidiary. The holding company thus can also be referred to as the parent company at that stage.

Africa
EgyptAir Holding Company
 • EgyptAir • EgyptAir Cargo • EgyptAir Express

Ethiopian Airlines Group
 • Ethiopian Airlines • Malawi Airlines (49%) • ASKY (40%)
Kenya Airways Holding Company
 Majority holdings:
 • Kenya Airways • Jambojet • Kenya Airways Cargo • Kencargo Airlines International
 Minority holdings:
 • Precision Air - 41.23% shareholding

 The Pilandair Group
  • Pilandair • Pilandair SkyCargo • Pilandair Executive • FlyTschinvali • Pilandair Cargo • Pilandair Express • PNATA 

 North Issetian Airways Group
  • North Issetian Airways • Ilania Airlines • Pekas Fly 

South African Airline Holdings Limited
 • South African Airways • South African Express • Mango

 Criatia Airlines Corporation
  • Criatia Airlines  • C-Air  • Criatia Air Commuter  • Criatia TransAfrican Air

Asia; Central, Far East, South, and Southwest
 Air China Group
 Majority holdings:
  • Air China • Air China Cargo • Air Macau • AMECO • Tibet Airlines • Dalian Airlines • Shandong Airlines • Shenzhen Airlines
 Minority holdings (by Air China):
  • Cathay Pacific (30%)
ANA Holdings
 Majority holdings:
  • Air Japan
  • Air Nippon
  • All Nippon Airways
  • Peach
  • Vanilla Air
 Minority holdings:
  • Philippine Airlines (9.5%)
 China Airlines Group
  • China Airlines • Mandarin Airlines • Tigerair Taiwan
 China Eastern Air Holding Company
 Major holdings:
  • China Cargo Airlines • China Eastern Airlines • China Eastern Yunnan Airlines • China United Airlines • Shanghai Airlines • OTT Airlines 
 Minor holdings:
  • Air France–KLM
 China Southern Air Holding
 Major holdings:
  • China Southern Airlines • Chongqing Airlines (60%) • GAMECO • XiamenAir (55%) 
 Minority holdings:
  • Sichuan Airlines (39%)
 Decor Aviation
  • Air Pegasus
 The Emirates Group
  • Emirates • Emirates SkyCargo • Emirates Executive• FlyDubai
 Etihad Airways
 Majority holdings:
  • Etihad Airways (100%)
 Minority former holdings:
  • Air Serbia (49%) • Air Seychelles (40%) • Virgin Australia (24%)
 Evergreen Group
  • Eva Air • Uni Air
 Hanjin Group
  • Korean Air • Jin Air
 HNA Group
 • Air Chang'an • China Xinhua Airlines • Hainan Airlines • Shanxi Airlines • Beijing Capital Airlines • Fuzhou Airlines • Grand China Air • GX Airlines  • Hong Kong Airlines • Lucky Air • Tianjin Airlines • Urumqi Air • West Air • Suparna Airlines • Africa World Airlines • Azul Brazilian Airlines • MyCargo Airlines • Virgin Australia
 InterGlobe Enterprises
  • IndiGo
 Jagson Group
  • Jagson Airlines
 Japan Airlines Corporation
  • Japan Airlines  • J-Air  • Japan Air Commuter  • Japan Transocean Air
 Kumho Asiana Group
  • Asiana Airlines • Air Busan (49%) • Air Seoul
 LEPL Group
  • Air Costa
 NANSHAN Group
  • Qingdao Airlines • Virgin Australia

 Qatar Airways Group
 Majority holdings: 
  • Qatar Airways •  Qatar Airways Cargo
 Minority holdings:
  • IAG (Aer Lingus• British Airways • Iberia Airlines) (21%) • Cathay Pacific (10%) • LATAM (10%) • China Southern Airlines (5%)
 Swire Pacific 
 Cathay Pacific (45%)
 Air Hong Kong (100%)
 HK Express (100%)
Air China (18% cross-ownership)
Air China Cargo (49%)
 Tata Sons
 Vistara (51%)
 Air India Limited (100%)
  • Air India • Air India Express• Air India Regional
 AIX Connect (100%)
 Wadia Group
  • GoAir
 Zagros Group
  • Zagros Airlines • Zagrosjet

Australasia, and Southeast Asia
 AirAsia Group
 AirAsia (100%)
 Thai AirAsia (45%)
 Indonesia AirAsia (49.25%)
 Philippines AirAsia (98.8%)
 AirAsia X (100%)
 Thai AirAsia X (50%)
Coming soon:
 AirAsia Vietnam
 AirAsia China
 AirAsia Cambodia
 Metro Aviation Group
 Indonesia Metro Aviation (100%)
 Thai Metro Aviation (45%)
 Malaysia Metro Aviation (49.25%)
 Philippines Metro Aviation (98.8%)
 Metro Aviation India (49%)
 Indonesia Metro Aviation X (100%)
 Thai Metro Aviation X (49%)
 Malaysia Metro Aviation X (49%)
Coming soon:
 Metro Aviation Vietnam
 Metro Aviation China
 Metro Aviation Cambodia
 Lao Metro Aviation
Garuda Indonesia Group
  • Garuda Indonesia • Citilink 
Lion Air Group
  • Lion Air • Batik Air • Wings Air • Batik Air Malaysia • Thai Lion Air 
Sriwijaya Air Group
  • Sriwijaya Air • NAM Air 
PAL Holdings
  • Philippine Airlines • PAL Express
 Malaysia Aviation Group
 Malaysia Airlines (100%)
 Firefly (100%)
 MASWings (100%)
 MASkargo (100%)
 Qantas Group
 Qantas (100%)
 QantasLink (100%)
 Jetstar (100%)
 Jetconnect (100%)
 Network Aviation (100%)
 Jetstar Asia (49%)
 Fiji Airways (46%)
 Jetstar Japan (33%)
 Alliance Airlines (20%)
 Singapore Airlines
 Singapore Airlines (100%)
 Singapore Airlines Cargo (100%)
 Tiger Airways Holdings (100%)
 Scoot (100%)
 Virgin Australia Holdings (20%)
 Vistara (49%)
Coming soon:
Scoot Indosin
 VietJet Air
 VietJet Air (100%)
 Thai Vietjet Air (100%)
 Vietnam Airlines
 Vietnam Airlines (100%)
 Pacific Airlines (98%)
 Vietnam Air Services Company (100%)
 Virgin Australia Holdings
 Virgin Australia (100%)
 Virgin Australia Regional Airlines (100%)
CPAir Holdings
Cebu Pacific (66.15%)
Cebgo (100%)

Europe
 Air France-KLM
 Air France (100%)
 Air France Hop (100%)
 Transavia France (100%)
 KLM (99.7%)
 KLM Cityhopper (100%)
 Transavia (100%)
 Martinair (100%)
 Air Calédonie (2%)
 Air Mauritius (5%)
 Air Tahiti (7%)
 Compagnia Aerea Italiana (7.08%)
 CCM Airlines (12%)
 Kenya Airways (7,8%)
 Royal Air Maroc (3%)
 Air Greenland
 Minority holdings:
• Norlandair (25%)
Deutsche Post World Net
• Aero Express Del Ecuador • DHL Aero Expreso • DHL Air UK • DHL de Guatemala • European Air Transport • SNAS/DHL
Fastjet
• Fastjet Tanzania • Fastjet Zimbabwe
 Icelandair Group
• Bluebird Cargo • Icelandair • Loftleiðir Icelandic • SmartLynx Airlines
 International Airlines Group
 Aer Lingus (100%)
 British Airways (100%)
 BA CityFlyer (100%)
 Iberia (100%)
 Iberia Express (100%)
 IAG Cargo (100%)
 Vueling Airlines (100%)
 OpenSkies (100%)
 Air Europa (20%)
 Lufthansa Group
 Majority holdings:
• Air Dolomiti • Austrian Airlines • Brussels Airlines • Eurowings • Lufthansa Airlines, Lufthansa Cargo, Lufthansa CityLine • Swiss International Air Lines • Edelweiss Air • SunExpress (50% with Turkish Airlines)
 OssetAvia Airways Group
 Majority holdings:
• O Airways • O Airways Cargo
 Ryanair Holdings
• Ryanair • Ryanair UK • Buzz (Ryanair) • Malta Air • Lauda Europe • Laudamotion
 SAS Group
    Majority holdings:
• Scandinavian Airlines 
 Minority holdings:
• Air Greenland (37.5%) 
 Smartwings
• Czech Airlines (98%) • Smartwings • Smartwings Hungary • Smartwings Poland • Smartwings Slovakia
 TAP Group
• Portugália • PGA Express • TAP Portugal
 TUI Group, TUI Travel
• TUI fly Netherlands - TUI fly Deutschland - Corsair International - TUI fly Belgium - TUI Airways - TUIfly Nordic
 Turkish Airlines
• Air Albania (49.1%) • AnadoluJet • SunExpress (50% with Lufthansa)
 Virgin Group
 Majority holdings:
• Virgin Atlantic (51%)
 Minority holdings:
• AirAsia X (20%) • Virgin Australia Holdings (8%)

North America
ACE Aviation Holdings
 Majority holdings:
 • Air Canada

Air Transport Services Group
 • ABX Air • Air Transport International • Capital Cargo International Airlines

 Alaska Air Group
 • Alaska Airlines • Horizon Air

American Airlines Group
 Majority holdings:
 • American Airlines • Envoy Air • Piedmont Airlines • PSA Airlines 
 Minority holdings:
 • Mesa Air Group (10%) • China Southern Airlines (2.76%)

Atlas Air Worldwide Holdings
 • Atlas Air (100%) • Polar Air Cargo (51%) • Titan Aircraft Investments

Grupo Aeromexico
 • AeroMéxico • AeroMéxico Connect

Copa Holdings
 • AeroRepública • Copa Airlines

Delta Air Lines
 • Delta Air Lines • Endeavor Air
 Minority holdings:
Air France–KLM (9%) • China Eastern Airlines Corp. (3.6%) • Grupo Aeromexico (36.20%) • Korean Air (4.3%) • LATAM Airlines Group (20%) • Virgin Atlantic (49%)

Hawaiian Holdings
 • Hawaiian Airlines • 'Ohana by Hawaiian

Hoth
 • Era Alaska - Era Aviation • Era Alaska - Frontier Alaska  • Arctic Circle Air

 Indigo Partners
 • Frontier Airlines

MatlinPatterson Global Advisors
 Majority holdings:
 
 Major former airline holdings:
 • Arrow Air • Global Aero Logistics ATA Airlines • Global Aviation Holdings North American Airlines • Global Aviation Holdings World Airways
 Minority former airline holdings:
 • Varig • VarigLogistica

Pacific Air Holdings
 • Pacific Wings • GeorgiaSkies • KentuckySkies • New Mexico Airlines • TennesseeSkies

Republic Airways Holdings
 • Republic Airlines 
 Former airline holdings:
 • Chautauqua Airlines : • Frontier Airlines : • Midwest Airlines • Shuttle America
Saltchuk Resources
 • Aloha Air Cargo • Northern Air Cargo

SkyWest, Inc.
 • SkyWest Airlines

Southwest Airlines Co
 • Southwest Airlines

Trans States Holdings
 • GoJet Airlines

United Airlines Holdings
 • United Airlines

WestJet
 • WestJet • WestJet Encore • WestJet destinations

South and Central America

 Synergy Aerospace Corp.
 Majority holdings:
 • (66%) AviancaTaca Holding S.A. - Avianca S.A. • TACA International Airlines S.A.
 • (100%) Avianca S.A. - SAM S.A. • Tampa Cargo • VarigLog • OceanAir • Macair Jet • VIP S.A. • AeroGal • Capital Airlines • Helicol S.A. • TurbServ

 Kingsland Holding
 Minority holdings:
 • (34%) AviancaTaca Holding S.A. - Avianca S.A. • TACA International Airlines S.A. • Volaris (25%)
 • (100%) TACA International Airlines S.A. - TACA Regional • LACSA • Aeroman • Pateland Airways • TACA Panamá

 LATAM Airlines Group
 Majority holdings:
 • LAN Argentina • LAN Cargo • LAN Chile • LAN Ecuador • LAN Express • LAN Perú • LAN Colombia •
 • ABSA Cargo Airline •LANCO • MasAir • TAM Linhas Aéreas S.A  • TAM Airlines • TAM Paraguay

 Aerolíneas Argentinas S.A.
 Minority holdings:
 • Aerohandling • Aerolíneas Argentinas Cargo • Aerolíneas Argentinas • JetPaq S.A. • Optar S.A. • AUSTRAL

 Avior Airlines Group
 Minority holdings:
 • Avior Airlines • Avior Airlines Perú • Avior Regional • Gran Colombia de Aviación • Tiara Air

Notes

References

 https://www.usatoday.com/travel/columnist/grossman/2009-10-06-multinational-airlines_N.htm
 http://www.encyclopedia.com/doc/1G1-84407703.html
 https://web.archive.org/web/20090117200642/http://www.dot.gov/affairs/1999/oig2599.htm
 https://web.archive.org/web/20090624051321/http://www.insideindianabusiness.com/newsitem.asp?ID=24951
 http://apnews.myway.com/article/20090116/D95OHIB80.html
 http://atwonline.com/news/story.html?storyID=15383
 http://uk.reuters.com/article/hotStocksNews/idUKLQ50585820090126
 https://www.reuters.com/article/rbssIndustryMaterialsUtilitiesNews/idUSL731902220090107
 http://www.business-standard.com/india/news/ai-ia-merger-may-get-delayed/00/12/346697/

Holding Companies
Company
Airline Holding Companies